Amleto Cataldi (2 November 1886 – 10 September 1930) was an Italian sculptor. His work was part of the sculpture event in the art competition at the 1924 Summer Olympics.

References

External links
 
 Amleto Cataldi (image)

1886 births
1930 deaths
19th-century Italian sculptors
20th-century Italian sculptors
20th-century Italian male artists
Italian male sculptors
Olympic competitors in art competitions
Artists from Naples
19th-century Italian male artists